John Worsley (21 June 1931 – 6 August 2021), more widely known under the pseudonyms Les Vandyke and Johnny Worth, was an English popular music songwriter from the 1950s to the 1980s, who started his career as a singer.

As "Les Vandyke", he wrote the UK No.1 hits "What Do You Want?", "Poor Me" (both for Adam Faith), and "Well I Ask You" (for Eden Kane).  He also wrote hit singles as "John Worth", notably "Gonna Make You an Offer You Can't Refuse" a number 8 UK hit in 1973 for Jimmy Helms and "To Have and To Hold", a #17 UK hit for Catherine Stock in 1986; and had notable industry success under his real name of John Worsley (especially with "Jack in the Box", a #4 UK hit for Clodagh Rodgers in 1971.)  His songs were recorded by various artists, including Petula Clark, Vince Hill, Engelbert Humperdinck, Anthony Newley, Bobby Vee, Shirley Bassey, Herman's Hermits, Marty Wilde, Bobby Rydell, Cleo Laine, Barbra Streisand, Jimmy Justice, John Leyton, Freddie and the Dreamers, Sammy Davis, Jr. and many more.

Early life
When John was born, his father, a Greek Cypriot, was reportedly determined to christen his son as Yannis Paraskos Skordalides as a Greek Orthodox, but his Welsh mother insisted that he be named John Worsley and christened in the Church of England. The name "Worsley" was chosen by his father during the Wall Street Crash of 1929 because he feared that he would not be able to get work  with a Greek name. He changed it by deed poll, choosing the name "Worsley" by placing a pin at random on a map of England, which landed on Worsley in Greater Manchester.  His father referred to his son as Yannis Skordalides throughout his life.  In their book, Big Time: The Life Of Adam Faith (2015), the authors David and Caroline Stafford assert that Worth was named Yani Panakos Paraskeva Skoradalides, but this is not supported by official records that confirm his registered name as John Worsley.  In his youth, he was simply known as John Worsley.

Career
After schooling, he began work as a draughtsman prior to his compulsory two years national service which he claims were the happiest two years of his life. Returning to civilian life, he determined to become a singer, changing his name for the purpose to Johnny Worth.

He worked in pubs as a semi-professional until he managed to secure a television appearance. Watching, was the wife of well-known leader of the Oscar Rabin Band, and Worth was signed to the band, with whom he remained for five years, making a number of recordings for Oriole Records and Columbia Records. He also recorded for the Embassy Records label, which produced cheap covers of popular hits, usually sold through Woolworth's stores. He even recorded covers of his own hit songs. He then joined the Raindrops vocal quartet (together with Len Beadle, Len's wife Jackie Lee and Vince Hill), which appeared on the television programme Drumbeat and subsequent LP. It was on this show that he met Oscar-winning composer John Barry, with whom he was soon to work, and the singer Adam Faith.

Worsely had aspirations to be a songwriter, and though initial attempts had failed, he asked pianist Les Reed to arrange a demo of his song "What Do You Want?". Faith, record producer John Burgess and Barry liked it, and with Barry's arrangements, Faith took the song to number one in the UK Singles Chart in November 1959, within which it remained for nineteen weeks. Worsely's concern was that as he was still signed to Oriole, he should adopt a pseudonym that was not "Johnny Worth".  He combined Reed's first name with his own telephone exchange, to become Les Vandyke.

As Vandyke, Worsley provided Faith with his follow-up number one "Poor Me", in January 1960, and for the next two years penned a further six Top Ten British chart hits for Faith (all credited to Les Vandyke): "Someone Else's Baby"; "How About That"; "Who Am I"; "The Time Has Come"; "As You Like It"  and "Don't That Beat All". Also in the guise of Vandyke, Worsley also wrote another chart-topper "Well I Ask You" for Eden Kane, a pseudonym for Richard, the eldest of the three Sarstedt brothers, as well as Kane's two follow up hits, "Get Lost" (reached No. 10 – September 1961) and "Forget Me Not" (No. 3 – January 1962).

At least two Vandyke songs were covered by well-known Australian artists: "Doin' The Mod" by Ronnie Burns's band the Flies (1965, first recorded by Vandyke with British band The Bambis, 1964) and "Dance Puppet Dance" by Little Pattie (also 1965, first recorded by Dave Duggan on Columbia in the UK, 1963), which reached number twelve in the Sydney-based pop charts.

Worsley -- alternating between the names of Les Vandyke and Johnny (or John) Worth -- also wrote music and songs for a number of low-budget movies during the 1960s and 1970s.  These included What a Whopper (1961 as Johnny Worth); The Kitchen (1961); Mix Me a Person (1962, as Johnny Worth); Some People (1962 as Johnny Worth – lyricist); Johnny Cool (1963 as Les Vandyke); Psychomania (1973) and The Playbirds (1978 as John Worth); plus Saturday Night and Sunday Morning (1960). Although his own singing career was over, he recorded three songs for the score of the 1968 short film Les Bicyclettes de Belsize, including the title song, once again credited as Johnny Worth.

Beginning in the late 1960s Worsley phased out his use of the Les Vandyke pseudonym, and was generally credited under his real name of John Worsley (or sometimes as "John Worth") for his work as a writer/producer.  He continued to work as a songwriter, and penned more big hit records in the early 1970s. In 1971, he wrote the United Kingdom’s Eurovision entry "Jack in the Box", performed by Clodagh Rodgers. It came fourth in the contest held in Dublin. For another example, he wrote and produced "Gonna Make You an Offer You Can't Refuse" a number 8 UK hit in 1973 for the American singer, and one-hit wonder, Jimmy Helms for Cube Records.

AllMusic journalist Bruce Eder states, "Vandyke is one of those rare talents in English pop music whose songwriting success crossed several genres and eras, from the end of the 1950s right into the 1970s".

During the 1970s, Worsley was one of the directors of the hotel and club venue, the Webbington Country Club, in the Mendips near Weston-super-Mare, Somerset.

In 1986, Worsley married Catherine Stock, sister of fellow songwriter, Mike Stock. Later that year, resurrecting the pseudonym "John Worth" as the credited writer/producer/arranger, he wrote, produced and arranged Stock's UK hit "To Have and To Hold", which reached number 17 in the UK Singles Chart.

Death
Vandyke died in August 2021 at the age of 90, at his home in Consett, County Durham.

Songwriting credits

References

External links

 www.45rpm.org.uk – "Pretty Blue Eyes" by Johnny Worth
PopArchives: The Flies – "Doin' The Mod"
PopArchives: Little Pattie – "Dance Puppet Dance"

[ List of songs composed by Vandyke] at Allmusic website
Fansite with well researched listing of Vandyke/Worth compositions
John Barry Website (with complete Drumbeat listings)

1931 births
2021 deaths
English songwriters
English male singers
English pop singers
People from Battersea
English people of Greek Cypriot descent
English people of Welsh descent
British male songwriters